Drvo znanja (meaning Tree of Knowledge in English) is a Croatian popular science magazine targeting children published monthly (except in summer) by SysPrint. The magazine is based in Zagreb, Croatia.

History and profile
Drvo znanja was first published in 1997. The magazine targets the students attending the fifth through the eighth grades. It usually covers all topics related to curricula such as plants, animals, history, art, technology, science, earth, human body, atlas, sport and English (the magazine dedicates two pages to learning English). The number of pages in each article varies between 80 and 110 color pages. There are Drvo znanja casings in different colors (green, blue, black etc.). The magazine usually includes features such as a readers' mail section, CD, web-links, posters, quiz, news from the world (usually the latest results of researches).

References

External links

 

1998 establishments in Croatia
Children's magazines published in Croatia
Croatian-language magazines
Education magazines
Magazines established in 1998
Magazines published in Croatia
Mass media in Zagreb
Monthly magazines
Popular science magazines
Youth magazines